The Bootleggers is a 1922 American silent drama film directed by Roy Sheldon and starring Walter Miller, Paul Panzer, and Jules Cowles. It is likely a lost film.

Cast
 Walter Miller as Jack Seville  
 Paul Panzer as Jose Fernand  
 Jules Cowles as The Hermit  
 Hazel Flint as Olive Wood  
 Norma Shearer as Helen Barnes  
 Jane Allen as Alice Barnes  
 Lucia Backus Seger as Mrs. Murphy

References

Bibliography
 Jack Jacobs & Myron Braum. The films of Norma Shearer. A. S. Barnes, 1976.

External links

1922 films
American silent feature films
American black-and-white films
Film Booking Offices of America films
1920s English-language films
1920s American films